Honey, I'm Homely! is the third studio album by the American rock band Dance Hall Crashers. Produced by the band and Stoker, the album was released on September 9, 1997, by MCA Records.

Background
Dance Hall Crashers signed to MCA's new 510 subsidiary in 1995 and released Lockjaw, highlighting the band's increasing direction into a punchier, pop punk style. Prior to recording Honey, I'm Homely!, DHC toured with bands such as Blink-182 and The Mighty Mighty Bosstones, and a host of Epitaph punk bands.

Critical reception

Rick Anderson of AllMusic called Honey, I'm Homely! "excellent," writing that "the Dance Hall Crashers succeed by worrying about tunes first and rhythmic signifiers second (if at all)." NME deemed it a "jumpy, fidgety, fun album," noting that "the amazing thing is how few tracks here descend into cliché."

Track listing

Personnel
Information adapted from liner notes.

Dance Hall Crashers
Elyse Rogers – vocals, management, production
Karina Deniké – vocals, production
Jason Hammon – guitar, production
Mikey Weiss – bass guitar, production
Gavin Hammon – drums, percussion, production

Additional musicians
Kincaid Smith – trumpet on "Salted," "Next to You," "Cold Shower," and "The Truth About Me"
 Efren Santana – saxophone on "All Mine," "Salted," "Next to You," "Cold Shower," and "The Truth About Me"

Production
Tim Palmer – mixing engineer
Mark O'Donoughue – mixing engineer
Frank Rinella – recording engineer
Stoker – recording engineer, production
Howie Weinberg – mastering engineer

Artwork
William George – cover illustration
Coco Shinomiya – art direction
Chris Cuffaro – photography

Charts

Weekly charts

References

External links
 

MCA Records albums
1997 albums
Dance Hall Crashers albums